Tlumach Raion was a raion (district) of the Ivano-Frankivsk Oblast (region) in Ukraine.  The city of Tlumach was the administrative center of the raion. The raion was abolished on 18 July 2020 as part of the administrative reform of Ukraine, which reduced the number of raions of Ivano-Frankivsk Oblast to six. The area of Tlumach Raion was merged into Ivano-Frankivsk Raion. The last estimate of the raion population was 

At the time of disestablishment, the raion consisted of three hromadas:
 Obertyn settlement hromada with the administration in the urban-type settlement of Obertyn;
 Olesha rural hromada with the administration in the selo of Olesha;
 Tlumach urban hromada with the administration in Tlumach.

References

Former raions of Ivano-Frankivsk Oblast
1940 establishments in Ukraine
Ukrainian raions abolished during the 2020 administrative reform